The following is a list of cantons of France, within each department:

Metropolitan France

French overseas departments and territories

See also
 List of former cantons of France

Cantons